Belawan–Medan–Tanjung Morawa Toll Road or Belmera Toll Road is a toll road in the east part of Medan in Indonesia that connects Belawan to Tanjung Morawa. The toll road was completed on December 15, 1986. Belmera is the first toll road in Indonesia outside the island of Java. The operator of Belmera is PT Jasa Marga.

History
The toll road was inaugurated in 15 December 1986, becoming the first toll road to be built in Sumatra. It was built by Japanese contractor, Takenaka Nippon Hutama and Pacific Consultant International.

Exits

See also

Trans-Sumatra Toll Road
List of toll roads in Indonesia
 Transport in Indonesia

References

External links
PT Jasa Marga website

Toll roads in Sumatra